Ponce de Leon Springs can refer to:

 Ponce de Leon Springs (Atlanta), former springs in Atlanta, Georgia
 Ponce de Leon Springs State Park, a park in the Florida panhandle